Christina Egelund (born 9 December 1977 in Hjørring) is a Danish politician, who was a member of the Folketing for the Liberal Alliance from 2015 to 2019.

Political career
Egelund was elected into parliament at the 2015 Danish general election, where she received 3,076 votes. In the 2019 election she received 2,026 votes and did not get reelected.

References

External links 
 Biography on the website of the Danish Parliament (Folketinget)

Living people
1977 births
People from Hjørring
Liberal Alliance (Denmark) politicians
21st-century Danish women politicians
Women members of the Folketing
Members of the Folketing 2015–2019
20th-century Danish women